The Kuchu Collective is a non-governmental organization that aims to promote and protect LGBTI rights in sub-Saharan Africa by developing and encouraging use of technological tools and materials that shield LGBTI persons and activists against hate groups, repressive governments and their institutions.

Activities
 The Kuchu Collective Yamba Android app. 
 Twifrica.
 Summer Source Camp, open source workshop.
 Africa Source, open source workshop.
 "10 Tactics for Turning Information into Action", a 50-minute film  that shows "how social justice organizations in the Global South use everything from Google Earth to Facebook in their campaigns."

See also
 Open Knowledge Foundation

References

External links
 Official site

Communications and media organizations
Information and communication technologies in Africa
Citizen media
International organizations based in Denmark
Information technology education
Free and open-source software organizations
International LGBT organizations